Bosch Solar Energy AG was a German solar wafer and solar cell manufacturer, based in Erfurt, which specialized in crystalline silicon-based photovoltaic (PV) products, as well as thin-film modules using amorphous silicon and CIGS absorber materials. The company consisted of various divisions for silicon, wafers, solar cells and modules, research and production facilities in Germany and France and plans were made to open a production line in Malaysia. It has been listed on the German stock exchange since 30 September 2005 and on 19 December 2005 its shares were admitted to the TecDAX. The enterprise was founded in 1997 as ErSol Solarstrom GmbH & Co. KG.

In 2013, Robert Bosch GmbH announced that it will exit from the solar business. SolarWorld took over production in Arnstadt and continued to employ about 800 workers.
The parent company also sold its shares of Aleo Solar.

History

Timeline: 
 March 1997
 Formation of a company as Ersol Solarstrom GmbH & Co. KG
 September 2005
 Initial public offer
 June 2008
 Robert Bosch GmbH becomes majority shareholder
 March 2009
 Groundbreaking for a new production facility in Arnstadt
 September 2009
 Change of name to Bosch Solar Energy AG
 November 2009
 Takeover of: aleo Solar AG (68,7% majority shareholding) and Johanna Solar Technologie GmbH (> 60% majority shareholding)
 March 2013
 Robert Bosch GmbH announced, the company will exit its solar business and sell or shut down all of these operations.
 May 2016
 Bosch Solar Energy AG was deleted from the German commercial register. The company's legal form was changed to "Bosch Solar Services GmbH", based in Arnstadt, Germany, a service company for solar product-related services that no longer operates any manufacturing facilities itself.

Structure and products
Bosch Solar Energy is subdivided into four different divisions according to product groups. The various subsidiaries are responsible for these divisions:
SRS Silicon Recycling Services The Bosch Solar Energy subsidiary SRS Silicon Recycling Services, Inc., specializes in the recycling of silicon. The scope of the ersol Group subsidiary currently covers silicon for solar and semiconductor applications, metallurgical grade silicon and support products. All grades of silicon.

Bosch Solar Wafers Bosch Solar Wafers GmbH is a specialist manufacturer of monocrystalline ingots and wafers. The Bosch Solar Energy subsidiary currently produces the following products:
 Monocrystalline silicon ingots
 (p- and n-type)
 Monocrystalline silicon wafers
 (p- and n-type)
 Crystals and wafers with special twin structures.
Solar Cells produces solar cells in the format 156 mm x 156 mm and is the core business sector. At a thickness of 200 µm and less, the average efficiency of monocrystalline ersol solar cells is around 17%. The share of production dedicated to higher-grade monocrystalline cells compared to multicrystalline solar cells is increasing and currently stands at about 80%. The parent company Bosch Solar Energy AG is responsible for production at its plants in Erfurt and Arnstadt.
Bosch Solar Modules is accountable for all group activities relating to the production and sale of solar modules. The division incorporates Erfurt-based Bosch Solar Thin Film GmbH, which is devoted to the production of thin-film solar modules and achieves significant savings in the raw material silicon with the aid of thin-film technology. In addition, ersol markets crystalline solar modules from solar cells produced by ersol and other manufacturers through its Erfurt-based trading subsidiary Bosch Solar Modules GmbH. The division also has a crystalline module production line at the planning stage.

Management board 
The management board of Bosch Solar Energy AG consists of four members:
Holger von Hebel, CEO (responsibilities: Corporate Development, Finance/Controlling, Human Resources, Corporate Communications, IT, Legal Affairs and Post Merger Integration)
Dr. Volker Nadenau, CTO (responsibilities: Research & Development, Process Development and Photovoltaic Strategy)
Jürgen Pressl, COO (responsibilities: Manufacture of Ingots, Wafers, Solar Cells, Crystalline and Thin-film Solar Modules, Purchasing/Supply Chain Management)
Peter Schneidewind, CSO (responsibilities: Sales, Marketing and Product Management)

Notes

External links
Corporate website of Bosch Solar Energy AG
Bosch to acquire 51 percent stake in ersol
Solar Energy Services

Technology companies of Germany
Thin-film cell manufacturers
Manufacturing companies of Germany
Manufacturing companies established in 1997
Renewable resource companies established in 1997
Technology companies established in 1997
Erfurt
German companies established in 1997